Warcq is a commune in the Ardennes département in northern France.

Geography
The Sormonne flows through the commune before flowing into the Meuse.

Population

See also
Communes of the Ardennes department

References

Communes of Ardennes (department)
Ardennes communes articles needing translation from French Wikipedia